= Graph algebra (social sciences) =

Graph algebra is systems-centric modeling tool for the social sciences. It was first developed by Sprague, Pzeworski, and Cortes as a hybridized version of engineering plots to describe social phenomena.
